Nicola Brogan MLA is a Sinn Féin politician who is a Member of the Legislative Assembly from West Tyrone in Northern Ireland.

Biography 
Brogan is from Omagh in County Tyrone.

Career 
Brogan worked in healthcare in County Tyrone before joining the Northern Ireland Assembly; being chosen by Sinn Féin to replace Catherine Kelly who resigned.

References

External links 
 Nicola Brogan at Twitter

Living people
Year of birth missing (living people)
Northern Ireland MLAs 2017–2022
Sinn Féin MLAs
Female members of the Northern Ireland Assembly
21st-century British politicians
People from Omagh
Politicians from County Tyrone
Northern Ireland MLAs 2022–2027